Petre Popeangă (born 19 May 1944, Lelești, Gorj County) is a Romanian politician and Member of the European Parliament. He is a member of the Greater Romania Party. He became a delegate MEP on 1 January 2007 with the accession of Romania to the European Union. Until November 14, 2007 he was a member of the Identity, Tradition, Sovereignty group.

External links
European Parliament profile
European Parliament official photo

1944 births
Living people
Popeanga, Petre
People from Gorj County
Greater Romania Party MEPs
MEPs for Romania 2007